Laura Gómez (born 19 April 1984) is a Spanish judoka. She competed at the 2016 Summer Olympics in the women's 52 kg event, in which she was eliminated in the second round by Andreea Chițu.

References

External links

 
 

1984 births
Living people
Spanish female judoka
Olympic judoka of Spain
Judoka at the 2016 Summer Olympics
Mediterranean Games gold medalists for Spain
Mediterranean Games medalists in judo
Competitors at the 2013 Mediterranean Games
Universiade gold medalists for Spain
Universiade medalists in judo
Sportspeople from Valencia
European Games competitors for Spain
Judoka at the 2015 European Games
Medalists at the 2009 Summer Universiade
21st-century Spanish women